RTZ is the callsign of the time signal transmitted on 50 kHz with 10 kW from a large transmission centre near Irkutsk, Russia. The transmitter is active 23 hours per day, from 22:00 to 21:00 UTC, except for the 3rd and 4th Monday of each month between 00:00 and 08:00 UTC, when it is switched off for maintenance. The station sends time signal similar to RBU.

RTZ covers the area in Siberia between 80 and 120 degrees east.

References

External links 
 http://www.irkutsk.com/radio/tis.htm

Radio stations in Russia
Time signal radio stations